D Philip (1943 – 12 June 2022), a native of Thiruvalla in the British Raj, was a film and drama actor who worked in the Malayalam film industry.

Career 
Philip started his acting career as a protégé of PJ Antony, first acting in the 1980 film Pralayam. This was followed by more than 50 Malayalam films including Kottayam Kunjachan, Vettam, Artham, Pazhashiraja and Time.

He co-produced the movie Kolangal with KT Varghese, directed by KG George.

He died in a private hospital in Thiruvananthapuram on 12 June 2022.

Awards 
In 1986, he won the State Award for his performance in the Kalidasa Kalakendra play 'Rainbow'.

References 

1943 births
2022 deaths
20th-century Indian male actors
21st-century Indian male actors
People from Thiruvalla